The Men's Individual AR1 was an archery competition in the 1992 Summer Paralympics.

Gold medalist, Koichi Minami, set a world record in the qualifying round. In the final he beat the US archer Richard Spizzirri.

Results

Qualifying round

Finals

References

Men's individual AR1